The 1982–83 SK Rapid Wien season was the 85th season in club history.

Squad

Squad and statistics

Squad statistics

Fixtures and results

League

Cup

European Cup

References

1982-83 Rapid Wien Season
Rapid
Austrian football championship-winning seasons